Linus Okok Okwach (20 October 1952 – 12 September 2020), was a Kenyan Roman Catholic prelate who served as Bishop of the Roman Catholic Diocese of Homa Bay. He was appointed as bishop of Homa Bay on 18 October 1993 and he resigned on 20 February 2002.

Background and priesthood
Okwach was born on 20 October 1952, in the city of Kisumu, in the Roman Catholic Archdiocese of Kisumu, in present-day Kisumu County. He was ordained a priest on 10 December 1980. He served as a priest of the Archdiocese of Kisumu, until 18 October 1993.

As bishop
Father Okwach was appointed Bishop of the Roman Catholic Diocese of Homa Bay, on 18 October 1993. He was the first Ordinary of the newly created diocese, and was consecrated a bishop at Homa Bay on 31 December 1993 by Cardinal Jozef  Tomko, Cardinal-Deacon of Gesù Buon Pastore alla Montagnola, assisted by Archbishop Clemente Faccani, Titular Archbishop of Serra and Archbishop Zacchaeus Okoth, Archbishop of Kisumu. Bishop Okwach resigned as Bishop of Homa Bay on 20 February 2002.

Illness and death
Bishop Emeritus Okwach fell down at his residence in 2019 and injured his back. He never stood up or walked again, since that fall. Three weeks before his death, Bishop Okwach was admitted to 
St Monica Hospital, in Kisumu on account of complications of his illness. He died, in hospital, on 12 September 2020. He was laid to rest at St Paul's Cathedral in Homa Bay, on 30 September 2020.

References

External links
 About the Roman Catholic Diocese of Homa Bay
 Diocese of Homa Bay, Kenya at GCatholic.Org

1952 births
2020 deaths
People from Kisumu County
20th-century Roman Catholic bishops in Kenya
21st-century Roman Catholic bishops in Kenya
Roman Catholic bishops of Homa Bay
Kenyan Roman Catholic bishops